Anthomastus giganteus, or the gigantic soft coral, is a deep dwelling species of soft coral from South Africa.

Description 
This soft coral is made up of large, fleshy polyps arising from a single long stalk. All the polyps are autozoids, meaning that they are independent and capable of feeding themselves.stalked. The disc-like base is often attached to a hard substance or to debris. The stalk ranges from pink or red to orange and the polyps are a paler beige, white or pinkish colour. Alternatively, the whole organism may be white in colour.

Distribution and habitat 
This species is known from the coast of South Africa.

References 

Animals described in 1954
Fauna of South Africa
Alcyoniidae